Gusan ("peak of Gusan";  Gusan) is a mountain located in Albania and Kosovo. This mountain belongs to the Accursed Mountains. It is connected by a ridge to Gjeravica in Kosovo, which is only a few kilometers south from it.

Notes

References

Accursed Mountains
Mountains of Kosovo
Mountains of Albania
International mountains of Europe
Albania–Kosovo border
Geography of Kukës County
Two-thousanders of Albania
Two-thousanders of Kosovo